Hubert Haddad is a Tunisian poet, playwright, short story writer and novelist. He was born in Tunis in 1947. His debut collection of poems Le Charnier déductif appeared in 1967, and his first novel Un rêve de glace was published in 1974.  Since then he has published numerous works in a wide range of literary forms.

Haddad is an experienced teacher of creative writing workshops.

Bibliography

All the following books are published, in French, by Éditions Zulma.

Novels
 Mā, 2015 
 Corps désirable, 2015 – Desirable Body, translated by Alyson Waters (Yale University Press, 2018)
 Théorie de la vilaine petite fille, 2014 – Rochester Knockings: a Novel of the Fox Sisters, translated by Jennifer Grotz (Open Letter, 2015)
 Le Peintre d'éventail, 2013 
 Opium Poppy, 2011 – Opium Poppy translated by Renuka George (Social Science Press, India, 2015)
 Vent printanier, 2010
 Géométrie d'un rêve, 2009
 Palestine, 2007 (Prix des cinq continents de la francophonie) – Palestine translated by Pierre L'Abbé (Guernica Editions, 2014)
 Oholiba des songes, 2007
 Le Ventriloque amoureux, 2002 
 L'Univers, 1999, 2009 
 Tango chinois, 1998 
 La Condition magique, 1997 (Grand Prix du Roman de la Société des Gens de Lettres)

Short stories
 Nouvelles du jour et de la juit, 2011
 Vent printanier, 2010

Others
 Les Haïkus du peintre d'éventail, 2013
 Le Nouveau Nouveau Magasin d'écriture, 2007
 Le Nouveau Magasin d'écriture, 2006

References

20th-century Tunisian poets
Tunisian novelists
Prix Louis Guilloux winners
1947 births
Writers from Tunis
Living people
21st-century Tunisian poets